"Eyes on You" is a song by British singer Jay Sean featuring the Rishi Rich Project, released as the second single from Sean's debut album, Me Against Myself (2004). It was Sean's debut solo single ("Dance with You" was released with the Rishi Rich Project) and was released on 21 June 2004. The song reached number six on the UK Singles Chart and number 18 in the Netherlands.

Music video
The song's music video is Jay Sean's second, after "Dance with You (Nachna Tere Naal)". It features two Seans, one a singer and the other a rapper. Throughout the music video, Jay Sean is depicted with various British Asians (of South Asian origin). It starts with Jay Sean the rapper trying to enter his locked up studio where Rishi Rich and Juggy D are already there. Jay Sean manages to get the door open. Just before he enters his studio room, a British flag and a Pakistani flag are shown adorning the doorknob. He finds that there is another Jay Sean there, the singer. He follows Jay Sean the singer to a party, where Rishi Rich, Juggy D and Madhu Singh, among others, are present. The two Jay Seans eventually face-off against each other in a rap battle where Jay Sean the singer emerges the victor.

Track listings
UK CD1 and European CD single
 "Eyes on You" (radio mix) – 3:12
 "Me Against Myself" (Jay Sean vs Jay Sean) – 3:13

UK CD2
 "Eyes on You" (radio mix) – 3:12
 "Eyes on You" (video edit) – 3:40
 "Eyes on You" (Rishi's Rich club mix) – 3:54
 "Eyes on You" (Drew's soul remix) – 3:30
 "Dance with You" (Laxman remix) – 3:04
 "Eyes on You" (video)

UK 12-inch single
A1. "Eyes on You" (Rishi's Rich club mix) – 3:53
A2. "Eyes on You" (radio mix) – 3:12
B1. "Eyes on You" (Rishi Rich Bouncement remix) – 3:44
B2. "Me Against Myself" (Jay Sean vs Jay Sean) – 3:13

Charts

Weekly charts

Year-end charts

References

2004 debut singles
2004 songs
2Point9 Records singles
Jay Sean songs
Relentless Records singles
Song recordings produced by Stargate (record producers)
Songs written by Hallgeir Rustan
Songs written by Jay Sean
Virgin Records singles